Bulbophyllum leniae is a species of orchid in the genus Bulbophyllum.

References

leniae